Nizhnedevitsk is a rural locality (a settlement) in Novoolshanskoye Rural Settlement, Nizhnedevitsky District, Voronezh Oblast, Russia. The population was 870 as of 2010. There are 16 streets.

Geography 
Nizhnedevitsk is located 19 km north of Nizhnedevitsk (the district's administrative centre) by road. Polyana is the nearest rural locality.

References 

Rural localities in Nizhnedevitsky District